Goldschmitt is a German surname meaning "goldsmith". It may refer to:
 Daniel Goldschmitt (born 1989), German footballer
 The Family Goldschmitt (1971), a poem collection by Henri Coulette

See also 
 Goldschmid
 Goldschmidt
 Goldschmied
 Goldsmid
 Goldsmith
 Aurifaber

Surnames
Occupational surnames